Novoyaksheyevo (Yañı Yaqşıy) is a rural locality (a village) in Nizhnesikiyazovsky Selsoviet, Baltachevsky District, Bashkortostan, Russia. The population was 40 as of 2010. There are 3 streets.

Geography 
Novoyaksheyevo is located 20 km north of Starobaltachevo (the district's administrative centre) by road. Nizhnesikiyazovo is the nearest rural locality.

References 

Rural localities in Baltachevsky District